Hans Cattini (24 January 1914, Grono, Switzerland – 2 April 1987, Lausanne, Switzerland) was a Swiss ice hockey player who competed in the  1936 Winter Olympics and 1948 Winter Olympics.  He was the brother of Ferdinand Cattini.

Personal life
Cattini was born on 24 January 1914 in Grono, Switzerland to Giovanni, who was a carpenter. He grew up alongside his younger brother Ferdinand Cattini. He worked as an electrician tradesman in Davos, Switzerland for teammate Albert Geromini.

Playing career
Starting in 1933, Cattini, his brother, and Bibi Torriani played on a forward line known as "The ni-storm", for HC Davos. The line was named for the last syllable (-ni) of players' surnames. The ni-storm was regarded as the top line of HC Davos and Switzerland's national hockey team. As a member of HC Davos, "The ni-storm" won 15 Swiss championship titles. This line consistently competed against Gebhard Poltera and his line from EHC Arosa.

He was inducted into the International Ice Hockey Federation Hall of Fame in 1998.

He died on 2 April 1987.

International play
In 1936, he participated with the Swiss ice hockey team in the Winter Olympics tournament. In 1948, he participated with the Swiss ice hockey team in the Winter Olympics tournament where he won a bronze medal. In total, the brothers were at seven IIHF World Championships between 1933 and 1949.

See also
List of Olympic men's ice hockey players for Switzerland

References

1914 births
1987 deaths
Ice hockey players at the 1936 Winter Olympics
Ice hockey players at the 1948 Winter Olympics
IIHF Hall of Fame inductees
Medalists at the 1948 Winter Olympics
Olympic ice hockey players of Switzerland
Olympic medalists in ice hockey
People from Moesa District
Swiss ice hockey centres
Olympic bronze medalists for Switzerland
Sportspeople from Graubünden